Frank Commons Pryor  (1919-1985) was a senior Australia public servant.

Life and career
Pryor graduated with first class honours in Philosophy from the University of Sydney, having been a member of the Philosophy Club there in 1939. Within a year of graduation, Pryor began his Australian Public Service career in the Department of the Treasury.

In November 1971, Pryor resigned from the Treasury after John Stone was appointed a Deputy Secretary in the Department. In December 1971 Pryor returned to the Australian Public Service as director of the Office of Secondary Industry within the Department of Trade and Industry.

In July 1972 the Australian Government approved the creation of 25 new positions in the Office of Secondary Industry, giving Pryor the opportunity to set up the nucleus for a full-scale Department of Secondary Industry.

In April 1973 the then Minister for Secondary Industry, Jim Cairns, proposed to Cabinet that Pryor be appointed to the board of the Australian Industry Development Corporation.

Pryor retired from the public service in 1984.

Pryor died in Canberra in November 1985.

Awards
Frank Pryor was created an Officer of the Order of the British Empire in January 1970 while First Assistant Secretary of the Treasury.

References

1919 births
1985 deaths
Australian public servants
University of Sydney alumni
Australian Officers of the Order of the British Empire